Venitsy is a rural locality (a village) in Nikiforovskoye Rural Settlement, Ustyuzhensky District, Vologda Oblast, Russia. The population was 208 as of 2002. There are 3 streets.

Geography 
Veshki is the nearest rural locality.

References 

Rural localities in Ustyuzhensky District